Marco Migliorini (born 3 January 1992) is an Italian footballer who plays as a centre back for  club Sambenedettese. He is a former Italy U20 Lega Pro international.

Club career
Born in Peschiera del Garda, the Province of Verona, Veneto, Migliorini started his career at A.C. ChievoVerona. He was a member of U17 team in 2008–09 season. He spent one and a half seasons with the reserve team from 2009 to January 2011. On 15 January 2011, Migliorini left for Brno.

Chieti
On 11 October 2011 Italian fourth division club Chieti completed the bureaucracy to sign Migliorini. Migliorini immediately played in the round 9. In total, he only missed 4 times out of possible 34 matches (round 9 to 42) in 2011–12 season, including one due to fourth caution. That season he was also selected to the representatives of second division group B, losing to first division A in 2012 Lega Pro Quadrangular Tournament. In April 2012 he was included in Italy U20 Lega Pro team for a youth tournament in Dubai, beating Al-Shabab in the final. He also played the postseason match against San Marino, winning 8–0.

Torino
On 7 July 2012, Serie A newcomer Torino F.C. signed Migliorini outright, for €280,000 in 3-year contract. He wore no.53 shirt for the first team. However, he struggled to get into the side due to the form of Italian International Angelo Ogbonna and Polish International Kamil Glik who were the club's regular centre backs.

Como
On 4 January 2013 Migliorini was sold to Calcio Como from Turin, with Simone Maugeri moved from Como to Piedmont.

Migliorini missed the first half of 2013–14 Lega Pro Prima Divisione season due to injury. On 1 February 2014 the contract was terminated in mutual consent.

Juve Stabia
On 15 June 2014 he was signed by Manager Giuseppe Pancaro for Juve Stabia in a 2-year contract. He impressed in his first season at the club leading the club to a 3rd-place finish in Lega Pro and reaching the playoffs for Serie B, however Juve Stabia missed out on promotion after losing their playoff match 5–4 on penalties to Bassano Virtus after a 1–1 draw on 17 May 2015.

After speculation linking him with a move to Tottenham Hotspur, on 19 July 2015, Juve Stabia Sporting Director Pasquale Logiudice confirmed that newly promoted Serie A side Carpi F.C. 1909 and English Championship club Leeds United were interested in signing the player.

Salernitana
In August 2018, he signed with Salernitana.

Novara
On 4 October 2020 he moved to Novara.

Gubbio
On 25 August 2021, he joined Gubbio.

International career
In April 2012 he represented Italy U20 Lega Pro team for a youth tournament in Dubai. He also played against San Marino Under 21s, winning 8–0.

References

External links
 Football.it Profile 

1992 births
Living people
Sportspeople from the Province of Verona
Footballers from Veneto
Italian footballers
Association football central defenders
Serie B players
Serie C players
A.C. ChievoVerona players
S.S. Chieti Calcio players
Torino F.C. players
Como 1907 players
S.S. Juve Stabia players
U.S. Avellino 1912 players
U.S. Salernitana 1919 players
Novara F.C. players
A.S. Gubbio 1910 players
A.S. Sambenedettese players
Czech First League players
FC Zbrojovka Brno players
Italian expatriate footballers
Italian expatriate sportspeople in the Czech Republic
Expatriate footballers in the Czech Republic